Eucalyptus thozetiana is a species of tree that is native to inland north-eastern Australia. It has smooth bark, or sometimes with rough bark near the base, linear to lance-shaped adult leaves, flower buds in groups of between seven and eleven, white flowers and urn-shaped, barrel-shaped or cylindrical fruit.

Description
It has smooth creamy white and greyish bark, sometimes with rough, blackish bark near the base and sometimes with small flakes of old bark in patches on the trunk. Flowering occurs from March to November and the flowers are white.

Taxonomy and naming
In his book Eucalyptographia of 1883, under the heading "Eucalyptus gracilis", Ferdinand von Mueller noted - 

In 1903, Joseph Maiden based a description of Eucalyptus calycogona var. thozetiana on Mueller's excerpt in his book, A Critical Revision of the Genus Eucalyptus.

In 1906, Richard Thomas Baker raised the variety to species status as Eucalyptus thozetiana in Proceedings of the Linnean Society of New South Wales. The specific epithet honours Anthelme Thozet.

Distribution and habitat
Eucalyptus thozetiana usually grows on sandy soils in woodland and open forest. It is widespread between Emerald, Junda and the Darling Downs in Queensland and near Arltunga in the south of the Northern Territory.

Conservation status
This eucalypt is classified as "least concern" under the Queensland Government Nature Conservation Act 1992, and as "near threatened" in the Northern Territory.

See also
List of Eucalyptus species

References

Trees of Australia
thozetiana
Myrtales of Australia
Flora of Queensland
Flora of the Northern Territory
Plants described in 1903
Taxa named by Ferdinand von Mueller